May ministry may refer to:

 First May ministry, the British majority (later caretaker) government led by Theresa May from 2016 to 2017
 Second May ministry, the British minority government led by Theresa May from 2017 to 2019

See also
 Premiership of Theresa May